The 2006 Cup of China was the third event of six in the 2006–07 ISU Grand Prix of Figure Skating, a senior-level international invitational competition series. It was held at the Nanjing Olympic Sports Center Gymnasium in Nanjing on November 9–12. Medals were awarded in the disciplines of men's singles, ladies' singles, pair skating, and ice dancing. Skaters earned points toward qualifying for the 2006–07 Grand Prix Final.

Results

Men

Ladies

Pairs

Ice dancing

External links
 

Cup Of China, 2006
Cup of China
Cup of China
Sport in Nanjing